The 1993 NBA draft took place on June 30, 1993, at The Palace of Auburn Hills in Auburn Hills, Michigan. The draft had some talented players at the top, but injuries and personal problems hurt many of them. Chris Webber, Penny Hardaway, Allan Houston, and Jamal Mashburn were All-Stars whose careers were cut short by injuries. Isaiah Rider and Vin Baker showed great potential but were plagued by personal problems. Bobby Hurley's career was derailed by a car wreck in December of his rookie year. The mid-to-late first round (starting with pick 13) was littered with players that failed to make any significant impact, with the exception of three-time NBA champion Sam Cassell. One of the NBA best all-time wing defensive players, three-time champion Bruce Bowen, went undrafted.

Despite having the lowest odds, the Orlando Magic won the first pick in the 1993 NBA Draft Lottery. It was the second year in a row the Magic won the draft lottery. The Magic drafted Chris Webber with the number one overall pick, but only minutes later, executed a blockbuster trade. The Magic traded Webber to the Golden State Warriors for their first round pick (#3 overall) Penny Hardaway and three of Golden State's future first-round draft selections.

Draft selections

Notable undrafted players
These players were not selected in the 1993 NBA draft but have played at least one game in the NBA.

Early entrants

College underclassmen
The following college basketball players successfully applied for early draft entrance.

  Milton Bell – F, Richmond (junior)
  Antonio Bowen – F, Northern Oklahoma JC (freshman)
  Shawn Bradley – C, BYU (freshman)
  Kenny Carter – G, Luzerne County CC (freshman)
  Parrish Casebier – G, Evansville (junior)
  Shawn Copes – F, Central Missouri (junior)
  Jim Dickinson – C, Seton Hall (junior)
  Anfernee Hardaway – G, Memphis (junior)
  Daniel Lyton – F, Riverside City (junior)
  Jamal Mashburn – F, Kentucky (junior)
  Malloy Nesmith – G, Utah State (junior)
  James Robinson – G, Alabama (junior)
  Rodney Rogers – F, Wake Forest (junior)
  Ryan Swank – G, Luzerne County CC (sophomore)
  Kevin Thomas – F, Beaver County CC (freshman)
  Ernest Vickers – F, Panhandle State (junior)
  Chris Webber – F, Michigan (sophomore)
  Luther Wright – C, Seton Hall (junior)

International players
The following international players successfully applied for early draft entrance.

  Etienne Preira – F, ADA Blois (France)

External links
 1993 NBA Draft

See also
 List of first overall NBA draft picks

References

Draft
National Basketball Association draft
NBA draft
NBA draft
Basketball in Michigan
Events in Michigan
Sports in Auburn Hills, Michigan